The 2021–22 Segunda División (known as LaLiga SmartBank for sponsorship reasons) football season, was the 91st since its establishment in Spain.

Teams

Team changes

Promotion and relegation (pre-season)
A total of 22 teams will contest the league, including 15 sides from the 2020–21 season, three relegated from the 2020–21 La Liga, and four promoted from the 2020–21 Segunda División B. This will include the winners of the play-offs.

Teams promoted to La Liga

On 8 May 2021, Espanyol became the first side to mathematically be promoted, assured of a return to the top flight following a 0–0 draw against Zaragoza. The second team to earn promotion was Mallorca, following Almería's 2-3 loss to Cartagena on 18 May 2021. Both teams made an immediate return to the first division after a season away. The final team promoted to La Liga was Rayo Vallecano by beating CD Leganés 5-1 and Girona FC 3-2 on aggration in promotion play-off.

Teams relegated from La Liga

The first team to be relegated from La Liga were Eibar, after a 1–4 loss to Valencia on 16 May 2021, ending their seven-year stay in the top tier. The second team to be relegated were Valladolid, following a 1–2 home defeat against Atlético Madrid on 22 May 2021, in their final game of the season, ending their three-year stay in the top tier. The third and final team to be relegated were Huesca, after drawing 0–0 against Valencia on 22 May 2021 in their final game of the season, suffering an immediate return to the second division. 

Teams relegated to Primera División RFEF

The first team to be relegated from Segunda División were Albacete,  following a 1-1 against Lugo in 18 May 2021, effectively ending their four-years stay in the second tier. Albacete was followed by Castellón, Logroñés and Sabadell. The three of those clubs were relegated in 30 May 2021, making an immediate return to the third tier after a single season in Segunda División.

Teams promoted from Segunda División B

Following the play-offs, the first team to achieve promotion were Real Sociedad B after defeated Algeciras on 22 May 2021. They are promoted to second division for the first time in 59 years. The second team to earn promotion were Amorebieta on 22 May 2021 after beating Badajoz. The third team to earn promotion were Ibiza on 23 May 2021 after defeated UCAM Murcia. For both victorious teams this was their first time ever promotion to the second division. The fourth and last team to get the promotion was Burgos after defeating Athletic Bilbao B on 23 May 2021. This was their 2nd promotion to the Segunda División, the last one being in 2001–02, where they ended being relegated.

Stadiums and locations

</onlyinclude>
Notes

Personnel and sponsorship

Managerial changes

League table

Standings

Results

Positions by round

The table lists the positions of teams after each week of matches. In order to preserve chronological evolvements, any postponed matches are not included to the round at which they were originally scheduled, but added to the full round they were played immediately afterwards.

Promotion play-offs

Season statistics

Top goalscorers

Top assists

Zamora Trophy
The Zamora Trophy was awarded by newspaper Marca to the goalkeeper with the lowest goals-to-games ratio. A goalkeeper had to have played at least 28 games of 60 or more minutes to be eligible for the trophy.

Hat-tricks

Note
(H) – Home ; (A) – Away

Discipline

Player
 Most yellow cards: 15
  Roque Mesa (Valladolid)
 Most red cards: 3
  Alberto Escassi (Málaga)

Team
 Most yellow cards: 124
 Fuenlabrada
 Most red cards: 11
 Fuenlabrada
 Fewest yellow cards: 77
 Real Sociedad B
 Fewest red cards: 2
 Burgos
 Zaragoza

Awards

Monthly

Attendance to stadiums

Restrictions
Due to the COVID-19 pandemic, clubs were not allowed to use the total capacity of their stadiums. According to the progress of the pandemic, the capacity allowed each month was decided by the Government of Spain, in agreement with the Autonomous Communities.

August (rounds 1 to 3): 40% of capacity allowed. Additionally, the Basque Country reduced it to 20%, Catalonia to 30% and the Valencian Community limited the attendance to a maximum of 15,000 spectators, always respecting the agreement.
September (rounds 4 to 7): 60% of capacity allowed. The Basque Country raised its own limit to 30%, while Catalonia did to 40%.
October (rounds 8 to 13): full capacity allowed, except for Catalonia and Basque Country, whose Governments limited the attendance to 60%.

Average attendances

Number of teams by region

See also
2021–22 La Liga
2021–22 Primera División RFEF (third tier)
2021–22 Segunda División RFEF (fourth tier)
2021–22 Tercera División RFEF (fifth tier)

References

 
2021-22
Spain
2